Homophony and Homophonic are from the Greek ὁμόφωνος (homóphōnos), literally 'same sounding,' from ὁμός (homós), "same" and φωνή (phōnē), "sound". It may refer to:

Homophones − words with the same pronunciation.
Homophony − in music is a texture in which multiple voices move together in harmony.
Homophony (writing) − in a theory of writing systems is one of the forms of phonogram.
 Homophonic substitution cipher − a cipher that disguises plaintext letter frequencies by homophony: 'e' is given more homophonic ciphertext symbols than 'z'.